USNS Sgt. Morris E. Crain (T-AK-244) was a  built at the end of World War II and served in the war prior to its demilitarization as a commercial cargo vessel. From post-war to 1950 she served the U.S. Army as a transport named USAT Morris E. Crain. In 1950 she was acquired by the U.S. Navy and assigned to the Military Sea Transportation Service. In 1975 she ended her career and was placed into reserve.

Victory ship built in California
Sgt. Morris E. Crain was laid down as Mills Victory under a U.S. Maritime Commission contract (MC hull V 741) on 14 February 1945 by Permanente Metals Corporation, Richmond, California; launched on 28 March 1945; sponsored by Miss Jane McVeigh; and delivered to the War Shipping Administration on 21 April 1945.

U.S. Army service
Renamed the Sgt. Morris E. Crain by the U.S. Army, the ship served the Army Transportation Corps until 1950 when it was transferred to the U.S. Navy.

Service with the MSTS
She was transferred to the Military Sea Transportation Service in February 1950 to become a United States Naval Ship. Home ported in San Francisco, California, Sgt. Morris E. Crain made trips to the major islands of the Pacific Ocean and carried military cargo to Korea in support of United Nations forces there.

As of 1974, Sgt. Morris E. Crain continued her service as a United States Naval Ship with a civil service crew. Assigned to the Military Sealift Command, Sgt. Morris E. Crain carried cargo for all the services.

Decommissioning
She was decommissioned at an unknown date and struck from the Navy List on 1 April 1975. She was returned to the U.S. Maritime Commission on 17 July 1975. Her subsequent fate is not recorded.

Honors and awards
 National Defense Service Medal

References

 
 NavSource Online: Service Ship Photo Archive - USAT Sgt. Morris E. Crain - T-AK-244 Sgt. Morris E. Crain

 

Victory ships
Ships built in Richmond, California
1945 ships
World War II merchant ships of the United States
Ships of the United States Army
Boulder Victory-class cargo ships
Korean War auxiliary ships of the United States
Suisun Bay Reserve Fleet